Distancias en Vivo is a live album from Puerto Rican singer Roy Brown. The album was released under Brown's label Discos Lara-Yarí in 1990.

Background and recording

Distancias en Vivo is the first live album released by Roy Brown. Like the Distancias album, released in 1977, most of the songs featured in this live album are based on Juan Antonio Corretjer's poems, including the title song.

Track listing

Personnel

Musicians

Notes 

1990 albums
Roy Brown (Puerto Rican musician) albums